Shashank Sheshagiri is an Indian playback singer, live performer and composer who works in Kannada, Tulu, Telugu and Tamil film Industries.

Background
Shashank was born to Sheshagiri. A & Arundathi K.P in Shimoga, Karnataka. Shashank's parents are originally from Mysore, Karnataka. The art of singing was in Shashank's life since the day of his birth, as his parents were live performers who sang during family weddings and other programs. Although Shashank has not learnt any traditional music, his mother Arundathi K.P - a classical singer - is his first guru. With her he started his singing journey by giving his first stage performance at the age of four to sing a devotional song 'Narayana Ninna'. After which he began accompanying his parents to sing at family weddings and parties.

To begin his career in singing, he moved to Bangalore at the age of 18. In the year 2008 he made his big success by winning the Kannada singing reality show 'Haadina Bandi' telecast by Kasthuri Channel.
Later in the year 2009 he made his debut as a Playback Singer in the film Meghave Meghave directed by V. Nagendra Prasad, by whom Shashank got to record three songs straight for the first time.

In 2014, his song 'Doona Doona' from the movie 'Belli' has made him the winner of the title 'mirchi best upcoming playback singer' in Mirchi Music Awards.

His song 'Mathdro' from Krishna Leela movie was nominated for IIFA Utsavam 2016. Since then he recorded several hit numbers for various music directors across the south, predominantly in the Kannada film industry. To this date Shashank has sung more than 500 songs in the South Indian film industry. His previous film to hit the theaters was Yajamana in the year 2019. Shashank has also given his voice for Radio commercials and T.V serials.

Other than playback singing he also sings at music festivals and corporate shows with his band 'Swar Alap'. Where, he has performed in abroad countries like Kuwait and Muscat.

Discography
 Meghave Meghave – Bellana Biliyettu (2009)
 Jarasandha – Yaaradru Haalagi Hogali (2011)
 Vinayaka Geleyara Balaga – Nodi Swamy (2011)
 Crazy Loka – Don't worry (2012)
 Dashamukha – Yaarigu Heladhe (2012)

2014

2015

2016

2017

2018

2019

2020

Independent music

Awards and nominations

Footnotes

Reality shows

References

External links
 
 Facebook
 Twitter

Discographies

 Shashank Sheshagiri on Gaana 
 Shashank Sheshagiri on Saavan

Singers from Karnataka
Indian playback singers
Indian television personalities
1991 births
Living people